Manuel Luis de Oliden (July 19, 1784 – November 15, 1869) was a Bolivian politician and military man.

He was born into a wealthy family in Buenos Aires and after his marriage to Mary Eustacia Amatler – daughter of Governor Intendant of Potosí in 1806 – moved to Upper Peru. He graduated with a Doctor of Law degree from the Royal University of Chuquisaca in 1808. As head of the urban militias of Chuquisaca, he supported the revolution of May 25 of 1809, an insurrection against the governor mayor of the city of Charcas.

1784 births
Politicians from Buenos Aires
Bolivian military personnel
Bolivian politicians
1869 deaths
19th-century Bolivian lawyers
University of Charcas alumni